Standard photographic print sizes are used in photographic printing. Cut sheets of paper meant for printing photographs are commonly sold in these sizes. 

Many nominal and effective sizes are specified in international standard ISO 1008 using millimeters only, although most are clearly derived from integer-inch lengths. They are highlighted in the table below.

United States 

In the US, size names are often denoted with a code of the format nR, where the number n represents the length of the shorter edge in inches. In the normal series, the long edge is the length of the short edge plus 2 inches (10 in or less) or 3 inches (11 in and above).
5R is twice the size of a 2R print, 6R twice the size of a 4R print and S8R twice the size of 6R.
4D/6D is a newer size for most consumer level digital cameras and Micro 4/3 cameras

The sizes with 7 × ,  and  × 12 inches are used for black-and-white paper.

Japan 

In Japan, the same print sizes (and several additional ones) are known by different designations.  The Japanese L is equivalent to 3R, while 2L—twice the size—matches 5R. KG represents the size of a traditional  in (4R) Japanese postcard (hagaki).
A W suffix indicates sizes with an extended long edge, similar to the American S prefix.
Japanese Chou sizes are for envelopes and Hagaki for postcards. They do not match exactly the related sizes from ISO 216, like A6 for international standard postcards.

Overview 

Unlike ISO 216 paper sizes, the aspect ratios of photographic prints vary, so exact scaling of prints is not always possible.  However, there are some logical correspondences between the sizes, noted below when applicable.

Many of the standard sizes are the same as sheet film formats, and are appropriate for making contact sheets from these films.

See also 
 Film format § Still photography film formats
 International standard paper sizes
 Paper size § Photography sizes
 Standard ad size

Notes

References 

Photographic processes
Media formats